David Bass may refer to:

David Bass, member of The Freight Hoppers
David Bass (American football) (born 1990), American football player
David L. Bass (1842–1886), American Civil War sailor

See also
David Baas (born 1981), American football player
Dave Bass (born 1950), American jazz musician